Sarah Douglas (born 12 December 1952) is an English actress. She is perhaps best known for playing the Kryptonian supervillain Ursa in Superman (1978) and Superman II (1980), Pamela Lynch in the 1980s primetime drama series Falcon Crest (1983–85), and Jinda Kol Rozz in one episode of Supergirl in 2018.

Her other prominent roles include evil Queen Taramis in the 1984 film Conan the Destroyer  and Mrs. Averill in the A Christmas Prince Netflix film series.

Early life
Douglas was born in Stratford-upon-Avon, Warwickshire, the second daughter of Beryl ( Smith), a physiotherapist who often worked upon RSC actors, and of Edward Douglas, a career member of the Royal Air Force. Having been educated locally at Alcester Grammar School, she then trained with the National Youth Theatre and the Rose Bruford College before turning professional.

Career
Eventually, Douglas's career took her in front of the camera with small appearances in the 1973 film The Final Programme (alternatively known as The Last Days of Man on Earth) and Rollerball in 1975. After this, Douglas became known to British television audiences in the 1970s by appearing in The Howerd Confessions, the TV version of Dracula, The Inheritors, Space: 1999 and Return of the Saint, and appeared in the films The People That Time Forgot and the controversial and rarely seen film The Brute (1977), in which she played an abused wife. Douglas' first major role was that of Ursa in Superman (1978) and Superman II (1980), having beaten 600 actresses to the part. In 1984, she played another fantasy villainess in Conan the Destroyer as the evil Queen Taramis. Douglas also continued to appear on television, and was a series regular in the short-lived British sitcom Thundercloud in 1979. Throughout the 1980s, she went on to appear in a variety of guest roles in UK and US series such as The Professionals, Bergerac, Hotel, Magnum, P.I., Sledge Hammer! and Remington Steele. However, her most prominent television role is that of Pamela Lynch in the primetime soap opera Falcon Crest, which she played for two seasons from 1983 to 1985. She also played another "Pamela" in the 1984 television miniseries V: The Final Battle.

In the 1990s, she returned to science fiction, guest-starring in Babylon 5 (in the 1994 episode "Deathwalker"), and in Stargate SG-1 (in the 1998 two-part episode "The Tok'ra"). Douglas has also appeared in a variety of genre films, including Solarbabies, The Return of Swamp Thing, Beastmaster 2, Puppet Master III: Toulon's Revenge and Return of the Living Dead 3. She also voiced characters in episodes of several animated TV series, including Iron Man, The Real Adventures of Jonny Quest, Superman: The Animated Series, Heavy Gear and Batman of the Future.

Recent appearances
In 2003, Douglas returned to the UK to appear in a nationwide tour of Hamlet playing alongside actress Emily Lloyd. The following year, she completed a run in London's West End in the play Roast Beef playing the role of Clytemnestra. Also in 2004, Douglas completed an audio commentary for the Special Edition DVD of Conan the Destroyer.

In 2006, she performed in the audio drama Sapphire and Steel: The Mystery of the Missing Hour alongside David Warner. Also in 2006, she was reunited with many of her Superman co-stars in Los Angeles as a new version of Superman II (known as Superman II: The Richard Donner Cut) was released with previously unseen footage. At the same time, a new Superman DVD boxset was released, featuring an interview with Douglas.

Douglas went on to appear in the 2007 Sci-Fi Pictures original film Gryphon, playing the mother of Jonathan LaPaglia's character.

In 2008, Douglas worked on further audio productions, and reunited with David Warner for a new BBC Audio CD entitled The Brightonomicon. She has participated in the audio recordings for Stargate Atlantis. Another 2008 screen credit was as a cancer-stricken transsexual in the BBC daytime series Doctors.

In 2009, Douglas completed work on a series of radio plays for the BBC. The first to air on BBC Radio 4 was Cry Babies, in which she performed alongside Alex Jennings. The play, written by film critic Kim Newman, was aired on 9 March 2009. A second play, with Derek Jacobi, aired on 13 March 2009 on Radio 4.

Douglas then appeared in the TV film Witchville which premiered on SyFy on 22 May 2010.

In June 2010, Douglas voiced the character of Professor Meadows in the video game "Blood of The Cybermen", part of the Doctor Who: The Adventure Games series which was made available for free download from the official Doctor Who website. She is also credited as the voice of 'The Entity' in the third game, simply named "TARDIS". She plays Jones, a class 14 super computer, in the fourth adventure game in the series, "Shadows of the Vashta Nerada".

In 2012, Douglas voiced a recurring role in the animated series of Green Lantern. She is also involved with a sci-fi audio series entitled The Flashback, which has been in production on both sides of the Atlantic. 2012 also saw the release of the comedy horror film Strippers vs Werewolves, in which Douglas appeared. The film co-stars Robert Englund, Steven Berkoff, Adele Silva and Billy Murray. In October 2012, Douglas completed recording an audiobook version of the Age of the Five fantasy novel trilogy by Trudi Canavan for Big Finish Productions. After this, she returned to the London stage appearing in The Hallowe'en Sessions at the Leicester Square Theatre from 29 October to 3 November 2012 to positive reviews.

In September 2015, Douglas made a couple of appearances in Emmerdale as a hospital consultant as a surprise for her mother Beryl, an avid fan of the show.

In 2016, Douglas appeared in writer/director Kenneth Mader's quantum time travel thriller "Displacement" as the mysterious Dr. Miles.

In 2017, Douglas joined the cast of the Netflix film A Christmas Prince as Mrs Averill, a palace advisor. She reprised the role a year later in A Christmas Prince: The Royal Wedding and in 2019 for the third film A Christmas Prince: The Royal Baby

In January 2018, the directors of Supergirl continued their tradition of casting former Superman movie stars and cast Douglas as Jinda Kol Rozz in the episode "Fort Rozz".

Personal life
Douglas married actor Richard LeParmentier (d. 2013) in 1981; they divorced in 1984.

Filmography

Film

Television

References

External links

 
 
 
 

Living people
English film actresses
English television actresses
English voice actresses
Alumni of Rose Bruford College
People from Stratford-upon-Avon
People educated at Alcester Grammar School
National Youth Theatre members
1952 births